Alan J. Justin (March 28, 1938 – February 6, 2019) was an American politician who served in the New York State Assembly from the 146th district from 1973 to 1974.

He died on February 6, 2019, in Elma, New York at age 80.

References

1938 births
2019 deaths
Republican Party members of the New York State Assembly